Alliance Global Group, Inc., styled on its logo as AllianceGlobal and also known as Alliance Global, Inc. (AGI), is a large holding company with business activities spanning the food and beverage industry (including both production and restaurant operations), gambling, and real estate development.

It is one of the largest companies based in the Philippines, and is managed by the family of its chairman and CEO Andrew Lim Tan. In 2017, the company moved its headquarters to Uptown Bonifacio, Taguig in the Manila metropolitan area (the National Capital Region of the Philippines).

Subsidiaries
Alliance Global Group is composed of several companies, including:

Food & Beverage
Emperador Inc. – the company's beverage production arm best known for its Emperador brandy, which became the world's best-selling brandy (by volume) in 2006. In 2014, Emperador Inc. purchased the Scottish whisky company Whyte and Mackay from India-based United Spirits Ltd for £430m. In 2015, Emperador Inc. made a deal with Beam Suntory for the purchase of several brands and production facilities for P13.8 billion (275 million euros). The deal with Beam Suntory included the purchase of Fundador from its owner, descendants of Pedro Domecq, and Bodegas Fundador (Spain's largest and oldest brandy dating to 1730 with facilities in Jerez and Tomelloso), Terry Centenario (Spain's top-selling brandy), Tres Cepas (Equatorial Guinea's top brandy brand), and Harveys (the UK's top brand of sherry).
The Bar Vodka

Real Estate
Empire East Land Holdings Inc. – a spun off company from Megaworld made to accommodate the middle-income market
Megaworld Corporation – the company's main real estate arm.
Megaworld Lifestyle Malls – the company's retail and commercial arm that develops its malls.
Suntrust Properties Inc.

Hospitality
Golden Arches Development Corp – 49% ownership
McDonald's Philippines – main franchise in the Philippines.
Travellers International Hotel Group, Inc. - is the developer of Resorts World Manila and  operates a gaming facility with hotel, retail, dining, leisure and entertainment attractions.

Infrastucture
Infracorp Development Inc. -  the infrastructure company of the Alliance Global Group Inc.

Others
Agile Digital Ventures
Global Estate Resorts Inc.
Alliance Global Solution
Pickaroo - Online Delivery App.
 Resorts World Manila - along with the Genting Group

References

External links
 

Conglomerate companies of the Philippines
Holding companies of the Philippines
Companies based in Quezon City
Companies established in 1993
1993 establishments in the Philippines
Companies listed on the Philippine Stock Exchange